Renato Navarrini (1892–1972) was an Italian stage and film actor. He was married to the actress Fanny Marchiò.

Partial filmography

 La tavola dei poveri (1932)
 Un cattivo soggetto (1933)
 Lohengrin (1936) - Il direttore dell'hotel
 Pietro Micca (1938) - Agostino di Sale
 Tutta la vita in una notte (1938) - (uncredited)
 Veneno do Pecado (1938) - (uncredited)
 Fuochi d'artificio (1938) - (uncredited)
 Fanfulla da Lodi (1940)
 Giuliano de' Medici (1941) - Il poliziano
 Il signore a doppio petto (1941)
 Marco Visconti (1941)
 The Mask of Cesare Borgia (1941)
 The Pirates of Malaysia (1941)
 L'ultimo addio (1942)
 A Pistol Shot (1942) - Il capitono Ivanov (uncredited)
 La bella addormentata (1942)
 Il fanciullo del West (1942)
 Jealousy (1942) - L'avvocato dell' accusa
 The Woman of Sin (1942)
 Mater dolorosa (1943)
 Tempesta sul golfo (1943) - Ceremoniere di corte
 La danza del fuoco (1943)
 La maschera e il volto (1943)
 Il cappello da prete (1944)
 Bluebeard's Six Wives (1950)
 Miracle in Milan (1951) - Un povero (uncredited)
 The Three Thieves (1954)
 Bread, Love and Jealousy (1954) - Un attore di varietà
 Napoli terra d'amore (1954)
 Piscatore 'e Pusilleco (1954)
 La ladra (1955) - Il Dottore
 Cantami buongiorno tristezza (1955) - The Notary Public (uncredited)
 Allow Me, Daddy! (1956) - Manfredi
 The Sword and the Cross (1956)
 Engaged to Death (1957)
 The Black Archer (1959) - Frate Lorenzo
 The Pirate and the Slave Girl (1959) - Omar
 Capitani di ventura (1961)
 Planets Against Us (I pianeti contro di noi) (1962)
 Venus Against the Son of Hercules (1962)
 Re Manfredi (1962)
 The Black Duke (1963) - Fortune-Teller
 Hercules and the Masked Rider (1963) - Don Francisco
 La ballata dei mariti (1963) - The Thief
 The Terror of Rome Against the Son of Hercules (1964)
 Hercules Against the Barbarians (1964)
 Hercules Against Rome (1964) - Argeso
 La moglie giapponese (1968)
 Black Talisman (1969)
 Heads or Tails (1969)
 La grande avventura di Scaramouche (1972) - (final film role)

References

Bibliography 
 Luca Verdone. I film di Alessandro Blasetti. Gremese Editore, 1989.

External links 
 

1892 births
1972 deaths
Italian male film actors
Italian male stage actors
People from La Spezia